The medial crural cutaneous branches of saphenous nerve provide cutaneous innervation to the medial leg.

Nerves of the lower limb and lower torso